Noelia Espíndola (born 6 April 1992) is an Argentine footballer who plays as a defender for Boca Juniors. She was a member of the Argentina women's national team.

She appeared at the 2014 Copa América Femenina. She previously represented Argentina at the 2008 FIFA U-20 Women's World Cup.

References

External links

1992 births
Living people
People from Ituzaingó, Corrientes
Argentine women's footballers
Women's association football defenders
San Lorenzo de Almagro footballers
Boca Juniors (women) footballers
Argentina women's international footballers
Competitors at the 2014 South American Games
South American Games gold medalists for Argentina
South American Games medalists in football
Sportspeople from Corrientes Province